The following lists events that happened during 1943 in the Union of Soviet Socialist Republics.

Incumbents
General Secretary of the Communist Party of the Soviet Union – Joseph Stalin
Chairman of the Presidium of the Supreme Soviet of the Soviet Union – Mikhail Kalinin
Chairman of the Council of People's Commissars of the Soviet Union – Joseph Stalin

Events

January 
 15–25 January – World War II: Battle of Voronezh (1943)

February 
 2 February – The Battle of Stalingrad officially ends with General Karl Strecker's surrender to Soviet forces.
10–13 February – World War II: Battle of Krasny Bor

July 
 12 July – World War II: Battle of Prokhorovka, part of the Battle of Kursk

August 
 Battle of Kursk

October 
 30 October – World War II: The Moscow Declaration is signed by the United States, the United Kingdom and the Soviet Union during the Moscow Conference.

November 

 6 November – The 26th Anniversary of the October Revolution Celebration Meeting

See also
1943 in fine arts of the Soviet Union
List of Soviet films of 1943

References

 
1940s in the Soviet Union
Years in the Soviet Union
Soviet Union
Soviet Union
Soviet Union